The 1999–2000 season of the Slovak Second Football League (also known as 2. liga) was the seventh season of the league since its establishment. It began on 31 July 1999 and ended on 11 June 2000.

League standing

See also
1999–2000 Slovak Superliga

References
 Jindřich Horák, Lubomír Král: Encyklopedie našeho fotbalu, Libri 1997

2. Liga (Slovakia) seasons
2
Slovak